Tramore is a community in Renfrew County, Ontario. It was named after the town of Tramore in Ireland.

Communities in Renfrew County